Hovik Hayrapetyan (February 15, 1990) is an Armenian chess Grandmaster (2013). In 2010, he became the Armenian Chess Solving Champion.

Achievements

2007: Second at Jermuk International Open Chess Tournament Under 18
2012: Second at Andranik Margaryan Memorial
2015: First at 76th Armenian Chess Championship First League
2021: First at the 11th Andranik Margaryan Memorial

References

External links

1990 births
Living people
People from Stepanakert
Sportspeople from Yerevan
Chess grandmasters
Armenian chess players